The Texas House of Representatives 47th district that represents west and south Travis County. The current Representative of this district is Vikki Goodwin, a Democrat from Shady Hollow.

The district is home to many in Austin.

List of representatives

References

047